Arnoldo Martínez Verdugo (12 January 1925 – 24 May 2013) was a Mexican socialist politician and democracy activist. A long-standing leader of the Mexican Communist Party and the Unified Socialist Party of Mexico (PSUM), Martínez promoted political self-criticism, refused to support regional guerrilla movements, condemned the Soviet invasion of Czechoslovakia and promoted the unification of the political left.

Biography

Martínez was born in Pericos, a small town in Mocorito, Sinaloa, into a family of farmers. His parents were Yssac Martínez Ortega and Silvina Verdugo Verdugo. He started working in his teens and in 1943 he decided to move to Mexico City to take a job at the San Rafael Paper Co. and undertake studies in painting at  National School of Painting and Sculpture (1944–46).

In 1946 he joined Mexican Communist Party and soon started directing its Communist Youth's organizing committee (1948–50). After some years rising through its hierarchy, including spending some time in the Soviet Union studying Communism, he joined a faction that succeeded in overthrowing the long-time leadership of Stalinist Dionisio Encina, who had led the party from 1940 to 1960. He was chosen as Secretary-General of the Mexican Communist Party's Central Committee in 1963 and remained in the post until 1981.

He was one of the protagonists of the political negotiations that in 1978 resulted in the first electoral reform that permitted the PCM to obtain conditional registration, allowing the party to participate in the 1979 election, where it won 18 seats, and one of its deputies served as Parliamentary Coordinator.

In 1981, he directed the dissolution of the Mexican Communist Party and its fusion with other leftist forces, resulting in the Unified Socialist Party of Mexico, which advanced it to the presidency in the 1982 elections. Before this, Martinez had been abducted and freed after the payment of a ransom.

He served twice in the Chamber of Deputies as a plurinominal legislator; first representing the Communist Party of Mexico (1979–82) and later representing the Unified Socialist Party of Mexico (1985–88). Subsequently, he joined with the forces of Cuauhtémoc Cárdenas Solórzano in his campaign for the Presidency in the 1988 elections.

Martínez was a member of the Party of the Democratic Revolution (PRD); a political institution he helped to found and finance in its early years. He was elected its emeritus advisor but his title was removed on 29 November 2009 on strategic grounds, as the result of political struggles inside the party. This maneuver was called "an act of moral amnesia, of disloyalty to its origins, of shabbiness" by Mexico's National Journalism Prize laureate Miguel Ángel Granados Chapa.

Publications
 (in ) Mexico City: , 1971.
 (The Mexican Communist Party and the Political Reform) Mexico City: , 1977.
 (Political crisis and Communist alternative) Mexico City: , 1979.
 (The Creation of the Unified Socialist Party of Mexico) Mexico City: , 1982.
 (March for Democracy) Mexico City: , 1982.
 (The Socialist Project) Mexico City: , 1982.
 (History of Communism in Mexico), Mexico City: Grijalbo, 1985.

Notes

References

1925 births
Party of the Democratic Revolution politicians
Members of the Chamber of Deputies (Mexico)
People from Sinaloa
Candidates in the 1982 Mexican presidential election
Mexican democracy activists
Mexican Communist Party politicians
Unified Socialist Party of Mexico politicians
Mexican communists
2013 deaths